Mine 3 was a station on the Port Authority of Allegheny County's light rail network, located in Bethel Park, Pennsylvania. The small station was located directly adjacent to an industrial park and was designed mainly as a way to provide access for workers at the associated businesses.

Mine 3 was one of eleven stops closed on June 25, 2012 as part of a system-wide consolidation effort.

History
The station's name is a historical reference to a coal mine that was once operated on the site of the current industrial area. Pittsburgh Terminal No. 3 Mine (Mollenaur / Mollenauer Mine) was opened by the Pittsburgh Terminal Railroad & Coal Company in 1903 and was still producing coal in 1938.

References

External links 

Port Authority T Stations Listings

Former Port Authority of Allegheny County stations
Railway stations in the United States opened in 1903
Railway stations closed in 2012